César Sempere  (born 26 May 1984, in Villajoyosa) is a Spanish rugby union player. He plays fly-half and fullback for El Salvador. Sempere plays for the Spanish rugby union team.

Professional career
The Spaniard has been capped 56 times by Spain playing fullback, wing and  fly half compiling an impressive tally of 31 international tries.
After a trial with Leicester Tigers, much of his rugby was played in his home country, though Top 14 experience is also on Cesar's resume having spent time with Montpellier Hérault Rugby before his switch to Championship campaigners Nottingham RFC.

References

External links
 
 César Sempere signs for Northampton Saints
 

Rugby union fly-halves
Rugby union fullbacks
Spanish rugby union players
Living people
Northampton Saints players
Expatriate rugby union players in France
1984 births
Spain international rugby union players
Spanish expatriate rugby union players
Spanish expatriate sportspeople in France
Expatriate rugby union players in England
Sportspeople from the Province of Alicante
Rugby sevens players at the 2016 Summer Olympics
Olympic rugby sevens players of Spain
Spain international rugby sevens players
People from Villajoyosa
Montpellier Hérault Rugby players
Nottingham R.F.C. players